Sapphic pop is a term used to describe a particular subgenre of indie music and bedroom pop. The genre typically has female, often femme, singer-songwriters and will often feature lyrical themes such as lesbian or queer love.

The name of the subgenre derives from sapphism.

Phoebe Bridgers, Muna, Tegan and Sara, Clairo, Girl in Red, and King Princess have been cited as examples of the genre. Some male singers may also be included in the classification, such as Sufjan Stevens and Hozier.

Additionally, some songs have been described as "sapphic anthems". For example, Muna and Phoebe Bridgers' song "Silk Chiffon" and G Flip and mxmtoon's song "Queen".

Meanwhile, artists such as Gemma Laurence have called their music "sapphic folk".

References

Indie music
Pop music
Indie pop
Bedroom pop